JDeveloper is a freeware IDE supplied by Oracle Corporation. It offers features for development in Java, XML, SQL and PL/SQL, HTML, JavaScript, BPEL and PHP. JDeveloper covers the full development lifecycle from design through coding, debugging, optimization and profiling to deploying.

With JDeveloper, Oracle has aimed to simplify application development by focusing on providing a visual and declarative approach to application development in addition to building an advanced coding-environment. Oracle JDeveloper integrates with the Oracle Application Development Framework (Oracle ADF) - an end-to-end Java EE-based framework that further simplifies application development.

The core IDE exposes an API that other teams in Oracle use to build extensions to JDeveloper. BPEL, Portal, Business Intelligence and other components of the Oracle platform all build their design-time tools on top of JDeveloper. To accommodate to Sun Microsystems (and thus NetBeans) acquisition versions released after 2012 are sharing significant code with NetBeans platform. The same IDE platform also serves as the basis of another Oracle product, SQL Developer, which Oracle Corporation promotes specifically to PL/SQL and database developers.

Features
Prior to JDeveloper 11g, JDeveloper came in three editions: Java Edition, J2EE Edition, and Studio Edition. Each one offered more features on top of the others, and all of them came for free.  JDeveloper 11g only has two editions: Studio Edition and Java Edition.  In JDeveloper 11g, J2EE Edition features are rolled into the Studio Edition.

A high-level list of features includes:

– Java Edition
 Java SE 9 Support
 Code Editor
 Code Navigation
 Refactoring
 Swing
 Unit Test
 Version Control
 Audit & Metrics
 Debugging 
 Profiling
 Ant Support
 Maven Support
 XML Support
 Open API & Extensions
 User Assistance

– J2EE Edition
 JSP
 Struts
 JSF
 JSF 2.0
 Facelets
 EJB
 TopLink
 Web Services
 RESTful Web Services
 UML
 Database Development
 Deployment and management
 Hudson

– Studio Edition
 ADF Databinding
 ADF Faces
 ADF Faces Skin Editor
 ADF Mobile
 ADF Business Components
 ADF Swing
 ADF Deployment
 BPEL Designer
 ESB Designer
 Portlet Development
 Portlet/JSF Bridge
 oracle BI Ee

In 2005, Oracle released JDeveloper as freeware.

In 2006, still under the 10g tag, and after significant delays, Oracle released version 10.1.3 - the latest major 10g release.

In October 2006, Oracle released version 10.1.3.1 that added support for the final EJB 3.0 spec along with BPEL and ESB design time.
 
In January 2007, Oracle released version 10.1.3.2 incorporating WebCenter capabilities such as creating and consuming portlets, portlet/JSF bridge, and content-repository data control.

In January 2007 Oracle had more than 150 people working in various roles on the product, including (in no particular order): developers, development managers, QA engineers, build engineers, doc writers, product managers, customer evangelists, and usability engineers. Development centers operated in Redwood Shores, in Bangalore, in Reading (UK), and in Pleasanton, Colorado.

In May 2007 Oracle released a technology-preview release of version 11g.

In October 2008 the production version of Oracle JDeveloper 11g, code-named BOXER, became available.

In July 2009 JDeveloper 11g version 11.1.1.1.0, code-named Bulldog, became available

In June 2011 JDeveloper 11g (11.1.2.0.0), code name Sherman, became available.

In September 2011 JDeveloper 11g (11.1.2.1.0 Build 6081), R2/PS1 became available.

In May 2012 JDeveloper 11g (11.1.2.2.0 Build 6183), R2/PS2 became available.

In September 2012 JDeveloper 11g (11.1.2.3.0 Build 6276.1), R2/PS3 became available.

In May 2013 JDeveloper 11g (11.1.2.4.0 Build 6436), R2/PS4 became available.

In July 2013 JDeveloper 12c (12.1.2.0.0 Build 6668) became available.

In June 2014 JDeveloper 12c (12.1.3.0.0) became available.

In October 2015 JDeveloper 12c (12.2.1.0.0) became available.

In June 2016 JDeveloper 12c (12.2.1.1.0) became available.

In August 2017 JDeveloper 12c (12.2.1.3.0) became available.

In September 2019 JDeveloper 12c (12.2.1.4.0) became available.

Visual and declarative
The JDeveloper code editor offers a rich set of coding features including visual and non-visual utilities that provide different views of the code. The software provides dialogs that guide the use of Java EE components.

For example, JDeveloper provides a visual WYSIWYG editor for HTML, JSP, JSF, and Swing. The visual editor allows developers to modify the layout and properties of components visually: the tool re-generates the code. Any changes in the code will be immediately reflected in the visual view. JDeveloper provides a similar feature for generating JSF and Struts page flows.

Declarative features enable programmers to generate EJBs or POJOs based on tables in relational databases. JDeveloper automates the creation of Java EE artifacts. For example, with a click on a visual artifact one can turn a Java class into a web service. JDeveloper generates the associated WSDL (Web Services Descriptive Language) document and related JAX-RPC components.

License
JDeveloper is free proprietary software for development and deployment. Oracle ADF has a runtime license when deployed outside of an Oracle Application Server.

See also
 Comparison of integrated development environments

References

Bibliography

External links
 JDeveloper Official Home

Integrated development environments
Java development tools
Oracle software
PL/SQL editors